Maryland Route 508 (MD 508) is a state highway in the U.S. state of Maryland.  Known as Adelina Road, the state highway runs  from MD 506 in Bowens north to MD 231 near Barstow.  MD 508 was constructed in the early 1930s from MD 231 to Adelina.  The southern terminus was rolled back to Bowens in the late 1950s.

Route description

MD 508 begins at a four-way intersection in Bowens.  Sixes Road heads east as MD 506 toward Port Republic and west as a county highway toward the Patuxent River.  Adelina Road continues south as a county highway toward the unincorporated community of Adelina and the historic home Taney Place, which was the birthplace of Supreme Court Chief Justice Roger Taney.  MD 508 heads north as a two-lane undivided road through a forested area with scattered residences.  The state highway reaches its northern terminus at MD 231 (Hallowing Point Road) near Barstow.

History
MD 508 was constructed from MD 231 south to Sheridan Point Road in Adelina in 1933.  The southern terminus was rolled back to MD 506 in Bowens in 1957.

Junction list

See also

References

External links

MDRoads: MD 508

508
Maryland Route 508